Buyan is a rural locality (a selo) and the administrative center of Novodubrovsky Selsoviet, Krutikhinsky District, Altai Krai, Russia. The population was 628 as of 2013. There are 5 streets.

Geography 
Buyan is located 25 km southwest of Krutikha (the district's administrative centre) by road. Bolshoy Log is the nearest rural locality.

References 

Rural localities in Krutikhinsky District